The 1925–26 Montreal Canadiens season was the team's 17th season and ninth as a member of the National Hockey League (NHL). The Canadiens lost their star goalie Georges Vezina to tuberculosis and struggled as a team, not making the playoffs. The league added teams in Pittsburgh and New York, New York taking the players of the former Hamilton Tigers franchise.

The team had a large turnover of personnel, partly due to Vezina's leaving. Alphonse Lacroix, Herb Rheaume and Bill Taugher all appeared in the Canadiens' net. New players included Bill Holmes, Wildor Larochelle, Albert Leduc, Alfred Lepine, Hector Lepine, Joe Matte and Roland Paulhus. Departures included the Cleghorn brothers, Odie and Sprague. Odie signed with Pittsburgh as playing-coach and Sprague was traded to the Boston Bruins for $5,000 on November 8, 1925. Cecil Hart took over as coach from Leo Dandurand, and Billy Coutu was named team captain.

Regular season

From 1911 Georges Vezina had been the Montreal Canadiens goaltender, and had led them to the Cup in 1924. In the first game of this season, he collapsed on the ice as the second period got underway. It was found that he had contracted tuberculosis and could no longer play. He went home to Chicoutimi, Quebec, where he died in March 1926. The team struggled with several goaltenders before Herb Rheaume won the job, but the team finished last.

In the second half of the season, the team had a twelve-game losing streak, from February 13, losing 0–3 to Pittsburgh, until March 16, winning 6–1 over Toronto.

Final standings

Record vs. opponents

Schedule and results

Playoffs

The Canadiens did not qualify for the playoffs.

Player statistics

Scoring leaders
Note: GP = Games played; G = Goals; A = Assists; Pts = Points

Leading goaltenders
GP = Games played, GA = Goals against, SO = shutouts, GAA = Goals against average

Awards and records
 Prince of Wales Trophy – awarded for winning first game in Madison Square Garden, December 15, 1925.

Transactions

References

See also
 1925–26 NHL season

Montreal Canadiens seasons
Montreal
Montreal